Onehunga is a suburb of Auckland, New Zealand.  

Onehunga may also refer to:

 Onehunga (New Zealand electorate)
 Onehunga Bay, in Whitireia Park, Porirua, New Zealand
 Onehunga Sports, a football club in Auckland